James Odell "Sap" Randall (born August 19, 1960) is an American former first baseman who played for the Chicago White Sox of the Major League Baseball(MLB) in 1988.

References

External links

1960 births
Living people
American expatriate baseball players in Canada
Baseball players from Alabama
Chicago White Sox players
Edmonton Trappers players
Grambling State Tigers baseball players
Major League Baseball first basemen
Midland Angels players
Nashua Angels players
Redwood Pioneers players
Salem Senators players
Sportspeople from Mobile, Alabama
Vancouver Canadians players
Grambling State Tigers baseball coaches
African-American baseball players
African-American baseball coaches